The Melbourne Hunt Club is an Australian fox hunting club founded in 1852.

History
The club was founded by Mr George Watson in 1852 with hounds brought to Australia from Ireland.

The kennels were originally at Kirk's Bizaar, in Bourke Street, Melbourne, subsequently they moved to St Kilda, Caulfield, Deer Park, Oakleigh, Cranbourne and finally to their current location in Pakenham.

The club maintains the oldest continual pack of hounds in Australia.

Hunt country
The club hunts areas in South and East Gippsland, as well as the Casterton - Hamilton area.

See also
List of hound packs of Australia

References

Footnotes

Bibliography
 Baily’s hunting directory, Melbourne Hunt Inc, retrieved 2 October 2016.
 Liam's hunting directory, Melbourne Hunt, retrieved 2 October 2016.
 Melbourne Hunt Club website, retrieved 2 October 2016.

1852 establishments in Australia
Sports clubs established in 1852
Sporting clubs in Melbourne
Fox hunts in Australia
Hunting organizations